Hulta is a settlement in Östergötland, Sweden.

References

Östergötland
Populated places in Östergötland County